Teatralna may stand for:
 Teatralna (Kyiv Metro), a station of the Kyiv Metro system in Kyiv, Ukraine
 Teatralna (Dnipropetrovsk Metro), a station of the Dnipropetrovsk Metro system in Dnipropetrovsk, Ukraine
 Teatralna Metro Station, a station of the Sofia Metro in Sofia, Bulgaria

See also
 Teatralnaya metro station (disambiguation)